Pratt Kennedy (died 1875) was an officer in the Bengal Artillery (later Royal Artillery) from 1808 to 1865. He is considered the founder of Shimla, summer capital of British India and now the capital city of Himachal Pradesh.

Footnotes

Year of birth missing
1875 deaths
Royal Artillery officers
History of Himachal Pradesh
Bengal Artillery officers